Józef Grzegorz Chłopicki (14 March 1771 – 30 September 1854) was a Polish general who was involved in fighting in Europe at the time of Napoleon and later.

He was born in Kapustynie in Volhynia and was educated at the school of the Basilians at Szarogrod, from which in 1785 he ran away in order to enlist as a volunteer in the Polish army. Chlopicki entered the army in 1785 and fought under Kościuszko in the Uprising of 1794. Warsaw was surrendered to the Russians on 8 November 1794, after which Chlopicki went to France and joined the Army of the Cisalpine Republic under General Jan Henryk Dąbrowski. In France he is known as Grégoire Joseph Clopicki de Necznia.

He was present at all the engagements fought during 1792-1794, especially distinguishing himself at the Battle of Racławice, when he was General Franciszek Rymkiewicz's adjutant. On the formation of the Italian legion he joined the second battalion as major, and was publicly complimented by General Nicolas Oudinot for his extraordinary valour at the storming of Peschiera. He also distinguished himself at the battles of Modena, Busano, Casablanca and Ponto.

In February 1807, the remaining infantry and cavalry regiments who had continued in French service in Italy were reorganized in Silesia, in the cities of Wrocław, Prudnik, Nysa, Korfantów and Brzeg, into a Polish-Italian Legion (PolaccoItalienne). In 1807 he commanded the first Vistulan regiment, and rendered good service at the battles of Eylau and Friedland. In Spain he obtained the Legion of Honour and the rank of a French Imperial Baron for his heroism at the battle of Epila and the storming of Zaragoza, and in 1809 was promoted to be general of brigade.

He was involved in battles from 1806 to 1812, including his involvement in the Spanish Campaign from 1808 to 1811. In 1812, he followed Napoleon to Russia where he fought at Smolensk and on the Moscow. At Smolensk he was seriously wounded, and on the reconstruction of the Polish army in 1813 was made a general of division.

Upon his return to Poland in 1814, Tsar Alexander I made him a General in the new Polish army with the rank of a general officer, but a personal insult from Grand Duke Konstantin Pavlovich resulted in his retiring into private life.

He held aloof at first from the November Uprising of 1830-31, but at the general request of his countrymen accepted the command on 5 December 1830. However, he saw the hopelessness of the insurrection and quickly resigned on 23 January; then, however, he joined the army as a private soldier and fought in some battles. At Wawer (19 February) and at the Battle of Olszynka Grochowska (20 February) he displayed all his old bravery, but was so seriously wounded at the Battle of Olszynka Grochowska that he had to be conveyed to Kraków, near which city he lived in complete retirement until his death in 1854.

References

1771 births
1854 deaths
Polish generals
Members of Polish government (November Uprising)
Recipients of the Legion of Honour
Recipients of the Virtuti Militari
Kościuszko insurgents
People of the Polish–Russian War of 1792
Polish commanders of the Napoleonic Wars
Generals of the November Uprising
Barons of the First French Empire
Names inscribed under the Arc de Triomphe